Cultural liberalism is a social philosophy which expresses the social dimension of liberalism and advocates the freedom of individuals to choose whether to conform to cultural norms. In the words of Henry David Thoreau, it is often expressed as the right to "march to the beat of a different drummer". Also known as social liberalism in the United States, cultural progressivism is used in a substantially similar context, although it does not mean exactly the same as cultural liberalism.

In following the harm principle, cultural liberals believe that, for the most part, society should not impose any specific code of behavior and see themselves as defending the moral rights of nonconformists to express their own identity however they see fit as long as they do not harm anyone else. The culture wars in politics are generally disagreements between cultural progressives and cultural conservatives. The cultural progressives believe that the structure of one's family and the nature of marriage should be left up to individual decision and argue that as long as one does no harm to others, no lifestyle is inherently better than any other.

Unlike cultural progressives, cultural liberals do not favour political correctness due to its attacks on certain civil rights and liberties such as freedom of speech and religion. In contrast to civil libertarianism, proponents of cultural liberalism will tend to show greater scepticism towards social reforms, such as gun law reforms, that can lead to increased risk of harm compared to that of the views of some civil libertarians.

The United States refers cultural liberalism as social liberalism; however, it is not the same as the broader political ideology known as social liberalism. In the United States, social liberalism describes progressive moral and social values or stances on socio-cultural issues such as abortion and same-sex marriage as opposed to social conservatism. A social conservative or a social liberal in this sense may hold either more conservative or liberal views on fiscal policy.

See also 
 Civil libertarianism
 Cultural radicalism
 Permissive society
 Pink capitalism
 Secular liberalism

Notes

References 
 Willard, Charles Arthur (1996). Liberalism and the Problem of Knowledge: A New Rhetoric for Modern Democracy. University of Chicago Press. .

Liberalism
Political science terminology